Chipping Norton is a market town and civil parish in the Cotswold Hills in the West Oxfordshire district of Oxfordshire, England, about  south-west of Banbury and  north-west of Oxford. The 2011 Census recorded the civil parish population as 5,719. It was estimated at 6,254 in 2019.

History

Pre-1800

The town name means "market north town", with "Chipping" (from Old English cēping) meaning "market". Chipping Norton began as a small settlement beneath a hill, where the earthworks of the motte-and-bailey Chipping Norton Castle can still be seen. The Church of England parish church dedicated to St Mary the Virgin stands on the hill next to the castle. Parts of today's building may date from the 12th century. It retains features of the 13th and 14th centuries. The nave was largely rebuilt in about 1485 with a Perpendicular Gothic clerestory. It is believed to have been funded by John Ashfield, a wool merchant, making St Mary's an example of a "wool church".

In July 1549 the Vicar of Chipping Norton, Henry Joyes or Joyce, led parishioners in a popular rising after the suppression of chantries and other religious reforms left him to minister alone to a congregation of 800 and reduced the budget for schooling. The rising was brutally put down by Lord Grey de Wilton. Joyes was captured, then hanged in chains from the tower of his church. The bell tower rebuilt in 1825 has a ring of eight bells, all cast in 1907 by Mears and Stainbank of Whitechapel Bell Foundry. It also has a Sanctus bell cast in 1624 by Roger I Purdue of Bristol.

Wool in the Middle Ages made the Cotswolds one of England's wealthiest parts and many of the medieval buildings survive in the centre of Chipping Norton. There is still a market every Wednesday and a mop fair in September, when the High Street is closed to through traffic. In 1205 a new market place was laid out higher up the hill. Sheep farming was largely displaced by arable, but agriculture remained important. Many original houses round the market place received fashionable Georgian façades in the 18th century. An inscription on the almshouses records them as founded in 1640 as "The work and gift of Henry Cornish, gent".

Post-1800
In 1796 James and William Hitchman founded Hitchman's Brewery in West Street. The business moved in 1849 to a larger brewery in Albion Street that included a malthouse and its own water wells. Three generations of Hitchmans ran this, but in 1890 Alfred Hitchman sold it as a limited company that acquired other breweries in 1891 and 1917. In 1924 it merged with Hunt Edmunds of Banbury and in 1931 the brewery here was closed. Other local industries included a woollen mill (see below), a glove-maker, a tannery and an iron foundry.

Chipping Norton had a workhouse by the 1770s. In 1836 the architect George Wilkinson built a larger one with four wings round an octagonal central building, similar to one he was building at Witney. The architect G. E. Street added a chapel to Chipping Norton workhouse in 1856–1857. The building became a hospital in the Second World War. It was taken over by the National Health Service in 1948 as Cotshill Hospital, later became a psychiatric hospital, and was closed in 1983. It has been redeveloped as private residences.

Chipping Norton was one of the boroughs reformed by the Municipal Corporations Act 1835. Its Town Hall designed in the neoclassical style was completed in 1842.

In 1962 it closed the station at Kingham, and two years later the B&CDR to freight, and dismantled the line. The disused railway tunnel is bricked up at both ends for safety and used as a refuge for bats. (See Wildlife and Countryside Act 1981)

In May 1873 rioting occurred after the sentencing of the Ascott Martyrs – 16 local women accused of trying to interfere with strikebreakers at a farm. Bliss Tweed Mill in the west of town was built as a tweed mill by William Bliss in 1872. In 1913 to 1914 the millworkers struck for eight months. The mill closed in 1980 and was turned into flats. It remains a landmark, visible from Worcester Road. The town lost its status as a municipal borough in 1974, when the Local Government Act 1972 made it a successor parish in the district of West Oxfordshire. The neoclassical Holy Trinity Roman Catholic church was built in 1836 by the architect John Adey Repton, grandson of the English garden designer Humphry Repton.

Governance
Chipping Norton is in the Witney parliamentary constituency, whose Member of Parliament from 2001 to 2016 was David Cameron, prime minister from 2010 to 2016 and leader of the Conservative Party from 2005. Since 2016 the MP has been the Conservative Robert Courts. One Conservative and two Labour councillors represent the town on West Oxfordshire District Council.

Amenities
The town theatre began life as a Salvation Army Citadel, its first stones, now visible in the auditorium, being laid in 1888. It continued as a furniture warehouse before being spotted by two Royal Shakespeare Company actors, Tamara and John Malcolm, in 1968. In 1973, fundraising for the new theatre began in earnest, and a pantomime, Beauty and the Beast was staged in the town hall. The Theatre was opened in 1975 by Tom Baker (who played the title character, the Doctor, in the BBC science-fiction TV show Doctor Who), beginning with a light programme including films and lunchtime jazz. The adjoining cottage was bought and converted into the bar and gallery. In 1990 a building bought in Goddards Lane now serves as green room, offices and rehearsal room.

The town hosts annual arts festivals: Chipping Norton Literary Festival ('ChipLitFest'), Chipping Norton Music Festival, and a jazz festival. The Theatre Chipping Norton opened in 1975 as a theatre, cinema, gallery and music venue for original productions and touring companies.

The town acts as a retail and leisure centre, with three supermarkets and numerous shops, including branches of national chain stores. It has four pubs, two hotels with public bars, and three schools. Holy Trinity Roman Catholic School and St Mary's Church of England School are primary schools. Chipping Norton School is the town's secondary school with a sixth form.

Chipping Norton Golf Club, now the Cotswold Club and part of Cotswold Hotel and Spa, is the oldest in Oxfordshire. It began in 1890 on Chipping Norton Common.

The first XV of Chipping Norton Rugby Union Football Club plays in the Southern Counties North League. It was league champion in 2007/08.

Chipping Norton has a purpose-built veterinary hospital, serving the community and the local zoos. The hospital's building was opened in July 2015 by then prime minister David Cameron. The previous premises were on Albion Street, where the practice had been based since it was founded in the 1970s. The hospital has a boarding cattery, a CT Scanner, and hosts one of only 15 radioiodine treatment units for hyperthyroid cats in the UK.

From 1989, the veterinary hospital had a partnership with the remote island of St Helena, using funding provided by the DfID for vets to visit the island. Since 2010, the island has had its own permanent vet and the connection has since been lost.

Chipping Norton Town F.C. ("The Magpies" or "Chippy") was founded in 1893 and plays at Walterbush Road. It resigned from the Hellenic Football League in favour of the Witney & District Football League.

Chipping Norton Town Cricket Club plays in Oxfordshire Cricket Association Division 6. The town also has a bowls club.

Chipping Norton has a Women's Institute, a Rotary Club, and a Lions Club.

Landmarks

Recording studio

From 1972 to 1999 the former British Schools building in New Street was Chipping Norton Recording Studios. Baker Street by Gerry Rafferty, In The Army Now by Status Quo, Too Shy by Kajagoogoo, I Should Have Known Better by Jim Diamond, Perfect by Fairground Attraction, I Just Died In Your Arms Tonight by Cutting Crew and Bye Bye Baby by the Bay City Rollers were recorded there. Jeff Beck, Barbara Dickson, Duran Duran, Marianne Faithfull, Alison Moyet, Nektar, Radiohead, The Supernaturals, Wet Wet Wet, XTC, Mark Owen and Chris Rea also used them.

Castle
Chipping Norton Castle was a timber Norman motte-and-bailey castle to the north-west of the town. Little of the original structures remains apart from earthworks.

Transport
Chipping Norton railway station served the town until 1962. A community bus network called The Villager links residential roads and nearby villages with the town centre. Longer-distance buses run to Oxford and Banbury. Diamond and Stagecoach in Warwickshire operate service X50/50 to Stratford-upon-Avon.

Chipping Norton set

Several media, political and show-business acquaintances living near the town, including David Cameron, have been called the "Chipping Norton set". Members regularly met socially. It gained notoriety after the News International phone hacking scandal, which involved several members. Those affected, along with several attending social functions, were victims of phone hacking by the News of the World. Notable group meetings included the nearby wedding reception Rebekah and Charlie Brooks, a 2010 Christmas dinner at the Brooks's, and Elisabeth Murdoch and Matthew Freud's 2011 Summer party at Burford Priory.

Twinning
Chipping Norton is twinned with Magny-en-Vexin in France.

Notable residents

The list covers notable persons with a Wikipedia page, born or long living in Chipping Norton. References are needed for information absent from the person's page.
Michael Baldwin (artist) born 1945 in Chipping Norton, is a British conceptual artist, author and founding member of the Art & Language artist group. He was born and lived in Chipping Norton, and lives in Middleton Cheney.
Sarah Averill (later Sarah Wildes, 1627–1692) migrated to Salem, Massachusetts, where she was hanged for witchcraft.
Geoffrey Burbidge (1925–2010), astronomy professor
Jeremy Clarkson (born 1960), Top Gear and The Grand Tour presenter, journalist and writer (see also Clarkson's Farm)
James Hind (1616–1652), highwayman born 1616 and executed for high treason in 1652
Conroy Maddox (1912–2005), surrealist painter resident here in 1929–1933
Princess Margaretha (born 1934), sister of the King of Sweden
Janice Meek (born 1944), world record-holding ocean rower
Wentworth Miller (born 1972), American actor, star of Prison Break, born here to American parents
Keith Moon (1946–1978), The Who drummer, once owned the Crown and Cushion Hotel in the High Street
Simon Nicol (born 1950), guitarist and vocalist with Fairport Convention
Walter Padley (1916–1984), trade unionist and politician
Dominic Sandbrook (born 1974), historian and columnist
Rev. Edward Stone (1702–1768), discoverer of the active ingredient of aspirin, lived in the town.
Barbara Toy (1908–2001), travel writer and playwright 
Elizabeth Jane Weston (1581 or 1582–1612), Neo-Latin poet, also known as Westonia, was born here.
Andrew Wigmore (born 1966), political activist associated with Arron Banks and Nigel Farage; Belize diplomat known for work on the Leave.EU campaign in the UK 2016 referendum on EU membership
Vivian Woodell, politician, founder of The Phone Co-op, based in the town
Roy Worvill (1914–2003), a writer on astronomy was born and lived in the town.

See also
Chipping Norton Museum of Local History
RAF Chipping Norton

References

Sources

External links

Official Town Website
Chipping Norton Tourist Information

 
Civil parishes in Oxfordshire
Cotswolds
Market towns in Oxfordshire
West Oxfordshire District